Dominic Toninato (born March 9, 1994) is an American professional ice hockey forward currently playing for the Manitoba Moose in the American Hockey League (AHL) while under contract to the Winnipeg Jets of the National Hockey League (NHL). He was selected in the fifth round, 126th overall, by the Toronto Maple Leafs in the 2012 NHL Entry Draft.

Playing career

Amateur
Toninato was born and raised in Duluth, Minnesota, and first played High School hockey with Duluth East High School. Toninato was selected as team captain for the Greyhounds in the 2011–12 season, and capped off a productive three-season career by helping the School to a fourth straight berth in the Minnesota State Class AA Tournament and delivered a 61 point season, amassing 27 goals and 34 assists in 25 outings to be selected as a Mr. Hockey Award finalist in addition to landing a spot on the All-State second team. On January 24, 2012, Toninato followed his fathers footsteps in committing to a collegiate career with the University of Minnesota-Duluth.

Having completed his senior year with Duluth East, Toninato closed out the season with the Fargo Force in the United States Hockey League, having been previously drafted by the club at the 2011 USHL Entry Draft. In gaining attention from the professional ranks as a two-way player, Toninato in his first year of eligibility was the first Minnesota prep school player drafted in the 2012 NHL Entry Draft, selected in the fifth round (126th overall) by the Toronto Maple Leafs.

Toninato returned to continue his development with Fargo of the USHL for the 2012–13 season. He completed a highly-productive season, tying for eighth among league scoring with 70 points in 64 regular season outings. He added six points during a 13-game playoff run in which the Force advanced to the Clark Cup finals and was selected to the USHL's Second All-Star Team.

Toninato joined the University of Minnesota-Duluth of the National Collegiate Hockey Conference and began his collegiate career in contributing with 7 goals and 15 points as a freshman in the 2013–14 season. He almost doubled his offensive output with 16 goals and 10 assists as a sophomore in the following 2014–15 campaign.

In his junior season with the Bulldogs in 2015–16, Toninato saw a dip in his production, scoring 15 goals and 21 points in 40 games and suffered a second successive regional finals failure in a 3–2 defeat to Boston College. Despite a contract offer in the off-season by the Maple Leafs to turn professional, Toninato passed to return for his senior year as captain with UMD.

In the 2016–17 season, Toninato registered a season best 29 points with 16 goals and 13 assists in 42 games and finished with a team-high +25 plus/minus rating. He led the Bulldogs to their first-ever NCHC title and advanced to the NCAA Frozen Four Championship game before suffering a defeat to the University of Denver. He was selected to the NCHC All-Tournament Team and honored as the league's best Defensive Forward.

Professional
Having completed his four-year collegiate career with the Bulldogs, Toninato was not offered an entry-level contract due to the Maple Leafs being up against the contract limit. With little interest in signing an AHL contract within the organization, Toninato rights were relinquished by the Maple Leafs after the August 15, 2017, deadline.

As a free agent, Toninato promptly signed to a two-year, entry-level contract with the Colorado Avalanche on August 17, 2017. After participating in his first rookie and main roster training camp with the Avalanche, Toninato was re-assigned to begin the 2017–18 season with AHL affiliate, the San Antonio Rampage on September 27, 2017. He made his professional debut with the Rampage on opening night in a 2–1 victory over the Ontario Reign on October 7, 2017. In his third game he scored his first two professional goals in a 6–2 loss to the Texas Stars on October 21, 2017. Playing a two-way responsible game with the Rampage, Toninato received his first recall to the Avalanche on November 17, 2017. Centering a line between Sven Andrighetto and Nail Yakupov, Toninato made his NHL debut with the Avalanche in a 5–2 defeat to the Nashville Predators on November 18, 2017. During the first period, Toninato was illegally boarded by the Predators' forward, Austin Watson, who was ejected from the game and later suspended. He missed the rest of the period with a head/neck injury before returning for the second period to play out the game. On February 14, 2019 Toninato scored his first NHL goal, after not scoring during the 37 games of his rookie season, in Colorado's 4-1 win over Winnipeg. 

On June 29, 2019, Toninato was traded by the Avalanche to the Florida Panthers in exchange for Jacob MacDonald. He agreed to his qualifying offer, accepting a one-year, two-way contract with the Panthers on July 15, 2019. In the following 2019–20 season, Toninato began the campaign in the AHL with affiliate, the Springfield Thunderbirds. He was soon recalled to the Panthers and cemented a role as a depth forward, recording a career high 4 goals and 11 points through 46 games. He returned after the COVID-19 pandemic pause, making his post-season debut in 3 games.

As an impending restricted free agent, Toninato was not tendered a qualifying offer by the Panthers and was released as a free agent. On October 10, 2020, Toninato was signed to a one-year, two-way contract with the Winnipeg Jets.

Personal life
His father, Jim Toninato, was also a former collegiate player with the University of Minnesota-Duluth. He collected 54 points in 155 games throughout his four-year career with Bulldogs from 1982 to 1986. During his tenure with UMD, Toninato majored in Human Resources Management.

Career statistics

Awards and honors

References

External links

1994 births
Living people
American men's ice hockey centers
Colorado Avalanche players
Colorado Eagles players
Fargo Force players
Florida Panthers players
Manitoba Moose players
Ice hockey people from Duluth, Minnesota
Minnesota Duluth Bulldogs men's ice hockey players
San Antonio Rampage players
Springfield Thunderbirds players
Toronto Maple Leafs draft picks
Winnipeg Jets players